Chacornac is an irregular lunar impact crater attached to the southeast rim of the crater Posidonius. It lies just to the east of the Mare Serenitatis, and north of the crater Le Monnier. The crater is named after French astronomer Jean Chacornac.

The rim of Chacornac has a somewhat distorted, pentagonal outline, and appears uneven, especially in the northwest where it is attached to the rim of Posidonius. The flooded floor is irregular and uneven, and contains a system of faint rilles called the Rimae Charocnac. There is no central peak, and no trace of a ray system. The ground around the crater is rugged, with a hilly, sloping rampart to the west.

Satellite craters 

By convention these features are identified on lunar maps by placing the letter on the side of the crater midpoint that is closest to Chacornac.

References

 
 
 
 
 
 
 
 
 
 
 

Impact craters on the Moon